Sivak is a Slavic-language surname derived from the nickname that refers to a man with gray hair, from the Slavic word sivy, gray, gray-haired.

Notable people with the surname include:

Jozef Sivák (1886–1959), Slovak politician
Martín Sivak, Argentinian journalist and author
Peter Sivák (born 1982), Slovak ice hockey player
Václav Sivák (born 1999), Czech kickboxer

See also

References